Mayyanad railway station (Code: MYY) is an Indian railway station situated at Kollam, Kerala.

Administration
Mayyanad railway station falls under the Thiruvananthapuram railway division of the Southern Railway zone of Indian Railways.

Background
It is a 'E-Class' railway station.

Line and location

Services
Three pairs of express trains have halts at Mayyanad railway station.

See also
 Mayyanad
 Paravur
 Kollam Junction railway station
 Paravur railway station
 Karunagappalli railway station

References

External links

Mayyanad
Thiruvananthapuram railway division
Railway stations opened in 1918